Kamel Masoud or Kamel Mosaoud (born 2 August 1914) was an Egyptian football forward who played as a forward for Egypt in the 1934 FIFA World Cup. He also played for the Egyptian team Al Ahly.

References

1914 births
Egyptian footballers
Egypt international footballers
Association football forwards
Zamalek SC players
1934 FIFA World Cup players
Year of death missing